Mary Janipher Bennett Malveaux (born 1967) is a judge of the Virginia Court of Appeals.

Life and education

Malveaux was born in Lynwood, California. She was raised in Richmond, and attended Collegiate School. She received a Bachelor of Arts from University of Virginia in 1990 and a Juris Doctor from University of Richmond School of Law in 1993.

Legal career

Admitted to the Virginia bar in 1993, she served as assistant commonwealth attorney in Henrico County, and gained a reputation as a tough but fair prosecutor. Beginning in 1998, she worked in private practice, handling both civil and criminal cases. In 2011 Malveaux became the first female full-time district court judge in Henrico County, serving in Virginia's 14th Judicial District.

Service on Virginia Court of Appeals

Malveaux was elected by the General Assembly on March 11, 2016, to an eight-year term beginning April 16, 2016, to fill the vacancy created by the elevation of Stephen R. McCullough to the Virginia Supreme Court. Her current term expires in on April 15, 2024. Her appointment to the court makes her only the second African-American appointed to the Appeals court in its history.

References

External links

1967 births
Living people
20th-century American women lawyers
20th-century American lawyers
20th-century African-American women
21st-century American judges
21st-century African-American women
21st-century American women judges
African-American judges
Judges of the Court of Appeals of Virginia
People from Lynwood, California
University of Richmond School of Law alumni
University of Virginia alumni
Virginia state court judges